The Buksefjord hydroelectric power plant is the first and largest hydroelectric power plant in Greenland. It was built by Nuuk-Kraft and it is operated by Nukissiorfiit, Greenland's national energy company.

In 1984–85, Greenland's energy authority prepared a Greenland's hydroelectricity development program. At that time all electricity in Greenland was produced by oil based fuels, but there had been a sharp rise in the oil prices the preceding years. Construction of a plant in Buksefjord was proposed by a private consortium in 1988.  In 1989, four companies were invited to a public tender.  However, later it was decided that construction of the plant will be financed by the Home Rule of Greenland and the plant will be rented to Nuuk-Kraft consortium.  Construction of the plant was approved by the Parliament of Greenland in 1990.  It was commissioned in 1993.

Originally, the plant had two turbines with capacity of 15 MW each.  In 2008, a third turbine with the same capacity was installed.

See also

 List of spans

References 

Hydroelectric power stations in Greenland
Energy infrastructure completed in 1993